Pierre-Hugues Herbert and Maxime Teixeira were the defending champion but they did not participate that year. 
Daniele Giorgini and Potito Starace won the title, defeating Hugo Dellien and Sergio Galdós in the final, 6–3, 6–7(3–7), [10–5].

Seeds

  Guillermo Durán /  Eduardo Schwank (quarterfinals)
  Alessandro Giannessi /  Máximo González (first round)
  Roberto Maytín /  Andrés Molteni (first round)
  Andrej Martin /  Jaroslav Pospíšil (quarterfinals)

Draw

Draw

References
 Main Draw

San Benedetto Tennis Cup - Doubles
2014 - Doubles